The Peltaspermales are an extinct order of plants belonging to Pteridospermatophyta, or seed ferns. It is unclear whether they form a natural group of organisms as they are poorly known. They span from the Late Carboniferous to the Early Jurassic. It includes at least one family, Peltaspermaceae, which spans from the Permian to Early Jurassic.  Along with these, two informal groups (the "Supaioids" and the "Comioids") of uncertain taxonomic affinities  exist, each centered around a specific genus ; Supaia and Comia. In 2009, a new genus from the Lower Permian/Leonardian Clear Fork Group was erected and named  Auritifolia waggoneri. It was assigned to the "comioids" based on its venation pattern, similar to that of Comia, as well as its simple pinnate fronds

References

Permian plants
Triassic plants
Prehistoric plant orders
Pteridospermatophyta
Permian first appearances
Triassic extinctions